Adam Farouk (born 12 December 1985) is a French former footballer who is last known to have played as a defender for Noisy-le-Sec.

Career

In 2004, Farouk signed for Dutch top flight side RBC from Racing Club de France in the French fourth division, where he made 13 league appearances and scored 0 goals. However, that October, he suffered a knee injury.

In 2005, he was released by RBC.

In 2006, he signed for French fifth division club Noisy-le-Sec after not playing for 1 year and a half due to injury.

References

External links
 
 

French footballers
Living people
Association football defenders
Eredivisie players
Expatriate footballers in the Netherlands
RBC Roosendaal players
French sportspeople of Moroccan descent
Racing Club de France Football players
Championnat National 2 players
Olympique Noisy-le-Sec players
1985 births